Soccer Dreams, a.k.a. Football Dreams, is a Canadian reality television programme that gives footballers ages 14–19 in North America the opportunity to win a contract with the Everton Football Club.

Based on the UK show Football Icon, Soccer Dreams tryouts began on June 29, 2007, in Toronto. Tryouts were also held in Montreal, Vancouver, Calgary and Winnipeg.

At each trial, a team of coaching staff, including Everton Football Club Academy Manager Ray Hall, whittled the trialists down to 36 competitors. On August 20, the final 36 reported back to Ottawa, where they played for the contract at the Oz Dome.

The show was produced by, amongst others, action film producer Jalal Merhi. Soccer Dreams debuted on June 7, 2008, on Fox Soccer Channel.

External links
Soccer Dreams website
Everton FC website

Everton F.C.
Soccer on Canadian television
Association football reality television series
2007 Canadian television series debuts
2000s Canadian reality television series